Peru adopted the metric system in 1862, replacing Spanish customary units.

History
In 1862, the Peruvian government decreed the metric system to be official in Peru. However, several years later the old measurements were still used. In 1869, a new law made the metric system compulsory.

In 1875 Peru adhered to the International Bureau of Weights and Measures in Sèvres, France.

The most current law regarding the measuring system is Law 23560 1982.

Current exceptions
 Gasoline, diesel, and kerosene are sold by the US gallon.
 Display sizes for television screens and computer monitors have their diagonal measured in inches.
 Nails are sold in inches.
 Coca leaves and potatoes are sold in arrobas.
 McDonald's sells its Quarter Pounder with cheese as "Cuarto de Libra con Queso", which translates from Spanish as "Quarter Pound with Cheese".
 Like in most countries, aviation (altitude and flight level) is measured in feet.

References

Peru
1862 establishments in Peru